RRS John Biscoe may refer to the following British survey ships:

 , in use 1944–1982
 , decommissioned in 1991

Ship names